Crick is a surname. Notable people with the surname include:

Bernard Crick (1929–2008), British political scientist
Francis Crick (1916–2004), British scientist and joint discoverer of the structure of DNA
George Crick (born 1891), English footballer
Kyle Crick (born 1992), American baseball pitcher
Mark Crick, British author and photographer
Michael Crick (born 1958), British journalist and biographer
Nancy Crick (1932–2002), Australian figure from the euthanasia debate
Odile Crick (1920–2007), wife of Francis Crick

Fictional characters:
Harold Crick, protagonist of a 2006 film Stranger than Fiction

See also
 Krick